Mishima: A Life in Four Chapters is the soundtrack to the 1985 film Mishima: A Life in Four Chapters. It features music written by Philip Glass and performed by, among others, Kronos Quartet. Sections from the soundtrack have been featured in other films and TV shows, including the piece 'Mishima / Opening', which was used to score the end credits of Peter Weir's 1998 film The Truman Show in addition to an appearance on an episode of Mr. Robot.

Paralleling the three different visual styles of the film, Glass uses different ensembles: The black-and-white biographical flashbacks are accompanied by a string quartet, whereas the realistic footage from Mishima's last day is accompanied by a string orchestra and percussion, and the stylized scenes from his novels with a large symphonic orchestra.

It was produced by Kurt Munkacsi and distributed by WEA through the Elektra Records subsidiary label Nonesuch Records.

Tracks

Credits
 Michael Riesman – Conductor
 The Kronos Quartet – String Quartets
 Neil Grover – Percussion
 Don Christensen – Assistant Recording Engineer
 Dan Dryden – Recording Engineer
 Kurt Munkacsi – Producer

References

External links
[ Mishima: A Life in Four Chapters entry] at Allmusic

Kronos Quartet albums
1985 soundtrack albums
Nonesuch Records soundtracks
Drama film soundtracks